The Williams Historic Business District is significant for its long time close association with the American development of tourism, which in
turn became a principal local industry. The reasons for this were that the District straddled the Atchison, Topeka and Santa Fe Railway (now the Southwest Chief) and U.S. Highway 66, two significant national transportation arteries, as well as being at the southern terminus of both rail and highway links to the
Grand Canyon. The District is also historically significant because of the role it played in the cycles of opening of the frontier west, from ranching to railroading and lumbering.

The Urban Route 66, Williams was listed on the National Register of Historic places May 19, 1989.

The Williams Historic Business District is architecturally significant because it contains within its boundaries an important selection of late 19th and early 20th Century vernacular architecture.

All of the buildings are two-story or less; most are single-story.  Several of the buildings constitute examples of a particular architectural style: the Fray Marcos Hotel
with its Renaissance Revival characteristics; the Cabinet Saloon and the Pollock Building made of native dacite as examples of Romanesque Revival, and the Tetzlaff Building, a yellow brick interpretation of Victorian Romanesque.

The boundaries of the District form an irregular area generally bounded by 4th St. on the west, 1st street on east,  Grant Ave. on the south, and the Fray Marcos Hotel on the north.  It lies in the center of the City of Williams and also includes the businesses associated with the Atchison, Topeka and Santa Fe Railway; U.S. Route 66 runs down the center of the District as Bill Williams Avenue.

Notable buildings

References

Romanesque Revival architecture in Arizona
Buildings and structures completed in 1890
Buildings and structures in Coconino County, Arizona
Historic districts on the National Register of Historic Places in Arizona
National Register of Historic Places in Coconino County, Arizona
Williams, Arizona